Gambia–Spain relations are the bilateral and diplomatic relations between these two countries. Gambia has an embassy in Madrid and honorary consulates in Almería, Barcelona, Gerona, Las Palmas de Gran Canaria, Madrid and Zaragoza. Spain has an embassy office in Banjul.

Diplomatic relations 
Bilateral political relations between Spain and the Gambia are considered correct and have not been too intense until very recent dates. From the migration crisis of 2006 a series of high-level visits began, including the first visit to Banjul of a foreign minister in June 2006 and the following one in October of the same year.

After the increase in bilateral relations in 2006, the foundations of a relationship were laid down which, having as an epicenter cooperation in the fight against illegal immigration, revolves around the following axes:

 Cooperation for the reinforcement of Gambian capabilities in border control matters, which is specified both in the donation of material and in the formation of the Gambian Navy by the Civil Guard.
Increase of official development assistance, especially in vocational training projects, job creation for young people and strengthening the administration. Although Gambia is not included in the 2012 Master Plan, it continues to receive funds invested by AECID in multilateral programs and projects, through the UN system and ECOWAS, as well as U.A.

Economic relations 
Bilateral trade relations are very scarce and Spain's trade balance with the Gambia registers a traditional surplus. In business, the volume of business and the Spanish presence in the Gambia are very modest. Spanish exports to the Gambia amounted to 14 million euros in 2015, representing an increase of 40% over the previous year. Among the main suppliers in Gambia, Spain ranked number 5 in the European Union, behind France and the United Kingdom.

The figures for Spain as a client country amount to 1.86 million euros in 2015, fifth position in the ranking behind the United Kingdom.

Regarding Foreign Direct Investment (FDI), there are no local sources available that record investment flows by country or by sector in the Gambia. The accumulated stock of Spanish investment in the Gambia between 1993 and 2013 is 0. The flow of gross investments in 2014 was 0. The stock of Gambia investments in Spain for that year was 0 and the gross investments for 2014 also 0. There is no Mixed Commission to deal with economic and commercial matters.

See also 
 Foreign relations of the Gambia
 Foreign relations of Spain

References